Same-sex unions are currently not recognised in Barbados. In September 2020, the government announced its intention to pass civil unions for same-sex couples, providing several of the rights, benefits and obligations of marriage. It also announced the possibility of holding a referendum on legalising same-sex marriage.

Background
In June 2016, Attorney General Adriel Brathwaite said the Government of Barbados was not considering changing the law to allow for same-sex marriages.

In July 2020, the government launched the "Welcome Stamp" visa program, allowing foreign workers to stay on Barbados for up to one year. After receiving criticism that the program only allowed workers to bring their opposite-sex spouse with them, the government changed the program rules to allow workers to bring their same-sex spouse as well.

In March 2022, attorney at law Lalu Hanuman suggested that the Marriage Act may not prohibit same-sex marriage, and called on same-sex couples to challenge the law in court. "It does not say in the prohibited or void sections that a man can't marry a man or a woman can't marry a woman. I think it ought to be considered a test case where an LGBTQ person approaches the magistrate to get the bands published … and tries to get married to someone of their same gender. I am confident it will be refused at the Magistrate's Court level, but then challenge it all the way up to the Caribbean Court of Justice and I think it could well succeed.", Hanuman said. The Act uses gender-neutral language, except in section 3 which states that "a marriage solemnised between a man and a woman" is void if the partners are related.

2018 Inter-American Court of Human Rights ruling

On 9 January 2018, in advisory opinion OC 24/7, the Inter-American Court of Human Rights (IACHR) ruled that countries signatory to the American Convention on Human Rights are required to allow same-sex couples to marry. The ruling states that:

Barbados ratified the American Convention on Human Rights on 27 November 1982 and recognized the court's jurisdiction on 4 June 2000. The ruling set binding precedent in favour of same-sex marriage for Barbadian courts.

Civil union proposal and marriage referendum
On 15 September 2020, the government announced its intention to pass a form of civil union, providing same-sex couples with a subset of the rights and benefits of marriage, and after that hold a referendum on the issue of same-sex marriage. Governor General Sandra Mason (since 2021 the President of Barbados) said in a speech to the Parliament that the country must have a "frank discussion" and "end discrimination in all forms".

LGBT activist Alexa Hoffmann said Mason's speech was filed with "smoke and mirrors, tiptoeing around and the use of buzz words. […] A nod is being given to civil unions but yet anything that relates to the LGBT community physically being able to practice that relationship is still criminalized and completely forbidden.", referencing the fact that Barbados law at the time criminalised same-sex sexual relations.

See also
LGBT rights in Barbados
Recognition of same-sex unions in the Americas

References

LGBT in Barbados
Barbados